Albutoin is an anticonvulsant. It was marketed in Europe as CO-ORD and Euprax by Baxter Laboratories. It was evaluated by the United States Food and Drug Administration, but not approved.

References 

Anticonvulsants
Allyl compounds
Thioureas
Lactams